The Buenos Aires and Pacific Railway (BA&P) (in Spanish: Ferrocarril Buenos Aires al Pacífico) was one of the Big Four broad gauge, British-owned companies that built and operated railway networks in Argentina.

The original concession was awarded by the Argentine government in 1872 to John E. Clark for the construction of a railway from Buenos Aires to Chile.  It was not until 1882, when the BA&P was registered as a joint-stock company in London, that Clark  was able to take over the concession.  Initially the new company only intended to build the section between Mercedes, in Buenos Aires Province, and Villa Mercedes in San Luis Province.  From Mercedes the company planned to obtain access to the city of Buenos Aires over the Ferrocarril Oeste track.  At Villa Mercedes it connected with the Ferrocarril Andino line that ran on to Mendoza and San Juan.

History

Opening

Work began on the line to Villa Mercedes in July 1882 and the line was opened on 8 October 1886. After a change of plan, the company applied for, and was granted, permission to build its own independent access to Buenos Aires. Therefore, in 1888 the BAPR opened the 100-km length Mercedes−Palermo. It was a long-distance service with only two stops existing, Caseros and Muñiz. In Buenos Aires, Retiro was an intermediate stop before reaching Central Station terminus through Buenos Aires Northern Railway rail tracks.

As Buenos Aires population increased, new stations were opening and frequencies were also increased. Some of those stations were La Paternal (which original name was "Chacarita") in 1887, Villa Devoto in 1888, Bella Vista in 1891 and San Miguel in 1896, Santos Lugares in 1906, Villa del Parque and Sáenz Peña one year later and El Palomar in 1908.

The Sánez Peña-Villa Luro line was opened in 1909, that same year Palermo station began to be built. Three years later the line reached Retiro, that was a provisional station so the BAPR had planned to build a terminus in front of Correo Central. Nevertheless, the project was never carried out and the lands were sold in 1931 to build Luna Park.

In 1938 the Sánez Peña-Villa Luro section was closed because of the construction of Avenida General Paz. The Municipality of Buenos Aires had stated that there could be no level crossings in the freeway which obligated BAPR to build a bridge over it. The line had been thought for freight services mainly, carrying merchandise to Riachuelo. However the creation of Port of Buenos Aires made cargo traffic decrease in the South of the city. The BAPR decided to close the line, leaving the Villa Real district without services and virtually isolated from public transport.
 
When it was first completed, the new line provided the provinces of the Cuyo with a direct rail link to the federal capital, instead of the much longer route, via  Villa María to Rosario and then by river steamer to Buenos Aires.

Takeovers
In 1898 the BA&P took over the British-owned company Villa Maria and Rufino Railway and a year later John Wynford Philips became chairman of the BA&P, a post he held until 1938.  During this period the company developed into a regional amalgamation of companies and dependent lines reaching from Buenos Aires to the Andes and extending from San Juan to Bahía Blanca.  In 1907 the Argentine Great Western Railway, which had long been a rival of the BA&P, was taken over.
 
The line between Buenos Aires and Valparaiso in Chile was finally completed when the link between Mendoza and  Santa Rosa de Los Andes in Chile, built by the Transandino Railway company was opened in 1910. In 1908 the BA&P acquired part of a building in Florida Street, in the centre of Buenos Aires, for offices.  As a result, the building became known as Edificio Pacífico and since 1990 has housed Galerías Pacífico, a well-known shopping arcade.

During this period, there was interest in electrifying the urban parts of the line in Buenos Aires, today the San Martín Line. Electrification was considered as early as 1907, and more concrete plans emerged in 1947 which included elevating the track through the centre of Buenos Aires, however, with the nationalisation of the railways in 1948, these plans were shelved.

Nationalisation
When the entire Argentine railway network was nationalised in 1948, during Juan Peron's presidency, the BA&P became part of the state-owned company Ferrocarril General San Martín.

References 
 Colin M. Lewis, British Railways in Argentina 1857-1914: A Case Study of Foreign Investment, Athlone Press (for the Institute of Latin American Studies, University of London), 1983.

External links

 

Defunct railway companies of Argentina
Railway companies established in 1872
Railway companies disestablished in 1948
5 ft 6 in gauge railways in Argentina
Rail transport in Buenos Aires Province
Rail transport in Santa Fe Province
Rail transport in Córdoba Province, Argentina
Transport in San Luis Province